Guzmania skotakii is a plant species in the genus Guzmania. This species is native to Costa Rica.

References

skotakii
Flora of Costa Rica